Tamás Lénárth (born 7 June 1990) is a Slovak football midfielder of Hungarian ethnicity who plays for Hungarian club Dorog.

References

External links

 at fcdac1904.com 

1990 births
Sportspeople from Dunajská Streda
Hungarians in Slovakia
Living people
Association football midfielders
Slovak footballers
FC DAC 1904 Dunajská Streda players
ŠK Senec players
ŠK 1923 Gabčíkovo players
Győri ETO FC players
Dorogi FC footballers
Slovak Super Liga players
2. Liga (Slovakia) players
Nemzeti Bajnokság II players
Slovak expatriate footballers
Expatriate footballers in Hungary
Slovak expatriate sportspeople in Hungary